is the name of several mountains in Japan:
 Mount Myōken (Nose) on the borders of Hyogo and Osaka prefectures - see Myoken Cable
 Mount Myōken (Tajima) in Hyogo Prefecture